Life for the Taking is the second studio album by American rock musician  Eddie Money. It was recorded and released in late 1978 in the US and January 1979 in the UK on manager Bill Graham's Wolfgang imprint via Columbia Records. The album includes the singles "Can't Keep a Good Man Down", "Maybe I'm a Fool" and "Maureen".

With Money seemingly endlessly on the road promoting his previous debut album, this effort was primarily written in hotel rooms with a variety of band members and worked up during sound checks prior to performances. The final track, "Call on Me" was often interjected into the set lists prior to the release of this album and received a strong response in spite of its more soulful, less frantic composure.

This album also marked a conscious effort to expand Money's audience with the inclusion of several more pop and dance oriented numbers. This direction would continue to be expanded upon with the subsequent release Playing for Keeps. The album was met with less enthusiastic critical response than its predecessor with a number of the pundits citing a weakness of quality songwriting and the inconsistency of style as pitfalls.

Money resumed his frantic promotion and touring schedule upon the release of this album. The cover shot plays on a rendition of the artist mocking his debut album artwork but with an obvious worn and tired appearance.

As with the previous release, both singles were issued in promotion only edited versions, while the retail releases featured tracks from the album as B-sides. By now, Money was headlining mid-sized venues and a number of the dates featured the then up-and-coming Pat Benatar as support.

Track listing

Personnel
 Horns arranged by Eddie Money & Tom Scott
 Strings arranged & conducted by Albhy Galuten
Musicians

 Jesse Bradman – piano
 Lloyd Chaite – guitar
 John DeLeone – drums
 Nicky Hopkins – keyboards, piano
 David Lindley – guitar
 Jimmy Lyon – guitar
 Gary Mallaber – drums
 Eddie Money – harmonica, keyboards, piano, saxophone, vocals
 Randy Nichols – keyboards, organ, synthesizer, vocals, background vocals
 Alan Pasqua – keyboards, piano
 Greg Phillinganes – keyboards, piano
 Steve Porcaro – synthesizer, background vocals
 Lonnie Rutner – bass
 Tom Scott – horn, saxophone
 Tim Sheridan – bass
 Lonnie Turner – bass
 Darrell Verdusco – background vocals 
 John Whitney – guitar
 Angela Winbush – background vocals 

Production
 Produced By Bruce Botnick (for Wolfgang Productions)
 Engineered By Andy Johns & Rik Pekkonen
 Mixed By Andy Johns
 Mastered By Wally Traugott

Charts

References

1979 albums
Eddie Money albums
Albums produced by Bruce Botnick
Columbia Records albums